The Socialist Youth is a Chilean youth organization advocating socialism. Michelle Bachelet, Chile's former president, was a member of this organization.

See also
International Union of Socialist Youth (IUSY)

External links
Juventud Socialista de Chile 
Partido Socialista de Chile

References

Political organisations based in Chile
Socialist Party of Chile
Youth wings of social democratic parties